Clermont–Alpha Road is a continuous  road route in the Isaac and Barcaldine regions of Queensland, Australia. It is signed as State Route 41 for its entire length. It is a state-controlled regional road (number 552), rated as a local road of regional significance (LRRS).

Route description
It starts as Wolfgang Street, running west and south-west through the locality of Clermont. This section of the road passes the Clermont solar farm. It crosses  from north-east to west. The road has no major intersections.

Land use along this road is mainly stock grazing on native vegetation.

Road condition

History

Gold was discovered at Clermont in 1861, and the town reserve was proclaimed in 1864. The Wolfgang pastoral run was adjacent to the town. Churches and schools opened in the 1860s, and copper was discovered soon after. The railway arrived in 1884 to serve the Peak Downs copper mine. Clermont became the administrative centre for the developing region, and is now the hub for the large coal mines in the region.

Surbiton pastoral run was established by 1866. In 2019 Surbiton was incorporated into Alpha.

Beaufort pastoral run, north-east of the town of Alpha, was established in 1863. In 2019 Beaufort was incorporated into Alpha.

The Alpha pastoral run was established in 1863, and settlement in the area that became the town began in the 1860s. In the 1880s the town expanded to include a workers camp during the construction of the railway line. Alpha railway station opened in 1884 and the town continued to grow, becoming the administrative centre for the district.

Early roads were cut from both Clermont and Alpha to provide access for wheeled vehicles to the pastoral runs and other settlements. Over time these tracks were improved and extended to eventually form a through road.

Modern usage
Although not yet fully sealed the road is used extensively by road trains carrying cattle, and by other large trucks conveying heavy goods. It reduces the distance between the two centres by almost  compared to the highway route via .

Upgrade

Progressive sealing
A project to seal almost  of road, at a cost of $3.01 million, was completed in August 2021.

See also

 List of road routes in Queensland
 List of numbered roads in Queensland

Notes

References

Roads in Queensland